Davis Hollow is a tributary of Fishing Creek in Columbia County, Pennsylvania, in the United States. The surficial geology in its vicinity mainly consists of alluvium, alluvial terrace, Wisconsinan Till, Wisconsinan Lag, Illinoian Flow-Till, and Illinoian Lag.

Course

Davis Hollow begins in a valley in Benton Township. It flows southwest for a short distance before turning west for several tenths of a mile, crossing Pied Piper Road. The stream then turns southwest for a few tenths of a mile, leaving the valley and entering a plain. It then turns southwest and crosses Pennsylvania Route 487 after several tenths of a mile. At this point, it turns south-southwest and reaches its confluence with Fishing Creek a short distance further downstream.

Geography and geology

There are two patches of alluvium, which contains stratified silt, sand, and gravel, near the upper reaches of Davis Hollow. However, the surficial geology in the area mainly consists of bedrock made of sandstone and shale as well as a glacial or resedimented till known as Wisconsinan Till. Some Wisconsinan Lag is present at the top of the valley. The surficial geology near the lower reaches of the stream mainly consists of alluvium, bedrock, alluvial terrace, Illinoian Lag, and a small patch of Illinoian Flow-Till.

Watershed
The mouth of the stream is in the United States Geological Survey quadrangle of Benton. However, its source is in the quadrangle of Stillwater.

History and etymology
Davis Hollow was entered into the Geographic Names Information System on August 2, 1979. Its identifier in the Geographic Names Information System is 1172989.

Davis Hollow is an unnamed stream that takes the name of the valley it flows through. The valley is in turn likely named after a local farmer or landowner.

According to Walter Brasch's 1982 book Columbia County Place Names, some maps list the valley of Davis Hollow as being in Fishing Creek Township, while others list it as being near Rohrsburg.

See also
Raven Creek, next tributary of Fishing Creek going downstream
Karnes Hollow, next tributary of Fishing Creek going upstream
List of tributaries of Fishing Creek (North Branch Susquehanna River)
List of rivers of Pennsylvania

References

Rivers of Columbia County, Pennsylvania
Tributaries of Fishing Creek (North Branch Susquehanna River)
Rivers of Pennsylvania